The BBC Radio 2 Folk Awards celebrate outstanding achievement during the previous year within the field of folk music, with the aim of raising the profile of folk and acoustic music. The awards have been given annually since 2000 by British radio station BBC Radio 2.

Award recipients have included Joan Baez, Cat Stevens, John Martyn, Steve Earle, The Dubliners, Martin Carthy, Billy Bragg, Shirley Collins, Kate Rusby, Cara Dillon, Eliza Carthy, Bellowhead, June Tabor, Oysterband, Aly Bain, Richard Thompson, Nancy Kerr, Seth Lakeman, Show of Hands, Lau, Tom Paxton, Don McLean, Ramblin’ Jack Elliott, Nic Jones, Bella Hardy, Rhiannon Giddens, Norma Waterson, The Chieftains, Joan Armatrading and James Taylor.

History
The awards are managed by independent production company Smooth Operations, now part of 7digital. Kellie While of Smooth Operations has stated that the idea of the BBC Radio 2 Folk Awards was conceived by the company in 1999, inspired by the Country Music Awards, and brought to the BBC, and The Guardian has attributed their creation to John Leonard, who formed Smooth Operations in 1995.

The awards event has been staged in different regions of the United Kingdom, including The Brewery in London, The Lowry theatre in Salford, the Glasgow Royal Concert Hall during the 2013 Celtic Connections festival, the Bridgewater Hall during the 2019 Manchester Folk Festival, the Wales Millennium Centre, Cardiff in 2015,
and the Belfast Waterfront in 2018. 
In 2014, 2016 and 2017, the event was held at the Royal Albert Hall in London.
Reviewing the 2014 Royal Albert Hall event, Colin Irwin remarked on how much more glamorous it had become since the first event fifteen years earlier. 

Between 2000 and 2012 the Folk Awards were hosted by Mike Harding, and broadcast on BBC Radio 2. Mark Radcliffe and Scottish Gaelic singer Julie Fowlis took over presenting the ceremony in 2013. In 2004 the awards were shown on television for the first time, on BBC Four. The event has been streamed live in audio and video on the BBC Radio 2 website, the BBC iPlayer and/or the BBC Red Button TV service.

The BBC Radio 2 Young Folk Award has been included in the award event since 2011, having previously been awarded in a separate ceremony, but its selection process remains independent.

In 2016, Rhiannon Giddens became the first non-British winner of the 'Folk Singer of the Year' award.

In 2020, there was no award ceremony due to the COVID-19 pandemic.

Selection
The controlling body is the Folk Awards Committee, comprising two BBC staff, two from the production company 7digital Creative, and one external expert. Two Nominated Representatives, one from 7digital and one from the BBC oversee the process. The Folk Awards Committee selects a panel of 150 representatives from the British folk world, including broadcasters, journalists, record producers, festival organisers, venue bookers, record company directors, agents and promoters. The panellists vary slightly from year to year, with new panellists being invited (or self-applying) each year.

The nominations in most categories are made by the panel. The four most-nominated artists go through to the second round. The winner is then selected from the nominees by a second vote among the same panellists. Since 2013, following criticism of the lack of transparency of the selection process, there have been some exceptions to this general process. The second round of the "Best Album" category is determined by a public vote, hosted on the BBC website. The two track categories, "Best Original Track" and "Best Traditional Track" were removed from the main panel. They are now voted by a much smaller specialist panel of judges, appointed by the Folk Awards committee, whose identities are published.  

Broader categories, including the "Lifetime Achievement Award" and the "Good Tradition Award" are chosen by two rounds of votes by the Folk Awards committee only. These may not be awarded every year.   

The BBC Radio 2 Young Folk Award, although presented at the Folk Awards ceremony since 2011, has its own independent selection process.

The selection process has been the subject of criticism, with accusations of bias, cronyism, and lack of transparency. In 2012 The Independent reported that there had been at least two Freedom of Information requests to identify the panellists, which have been rejected by the BBC. The BBC and 7digital have responded that the panellists are kept secret to avoid lobbying and bribery.

Compilation album 
A Folk Awards double-album, featuring music by most of the nominees, was released annually by the event's producers in collaboration with BBC Radio 2 and the record label and distribution company, Proper Music.

Hall of Fame 
In 2014, a posthumous award was introduced to celebrate the contribution of significant figures in folk music's past. 
 2019 inductee: Leonard Cohen (with tribute performance by Thea Gilmore)
 2018 inductee: Nick Drake (with tribute performance by Olivia Chaney)
 2017 inductee: Woody Guthrie (with tribute performance by Billy Bragg)
 2016 inductee: Sandy Denny (with tribute performance by Rufus Wainwright and original members of Fairport Convention)
 2015 inductee: Ewan MacColl (with tribute performance by Guy Garvey and the MacColl family)
 2014 inductee: Cecil Sharp

Award winners

2019
 Folk Singer of the Year: Ríoghnach Connolly
 Best Duo / Group: Catrin Finch & Seckou Keita
 Horizon Award: Brìghde Chaimbeul
 Best Traditional Track: The Foggy Dew - Ye Vagabonds
 Best Original Track: I Burn but I Am Not Consumed - Karine Polwart
 Best Album: Hide and Hair - The Trials of Cato
 Musician of the Year: Seckou Keita
 Young Folk Award: Maddie Morris
 Lifetime Achievement Awards: Dervish and Wizz Jones
 Hall of Fame: Leonard Cohen
Presenter Mark Radcliffe was also presented with a special Folk Award to celebrate his 40 years in radio.

Venue: Bridgewater Hall, Manchester

2018
 Folk Singer of the Year: Karine Polwart
 Best Duo: Chris Stout & Catriona McKay
 Best Group: Lankum
 Best Album: Strangers - The Young'uns
 Horizon Award: Ímar
 Musician of the Year: Mohsen Amini
 Young Folk Award: Mera Royle
 Best Original Song: The Granite Gaze - Lankum
 Best Traditional Track: Banks of Newfoundland - Siobhan Miller
 Lifetime Achievement Award: Dónal Lunny
 Hall of Fame: Nick Drake
 Good Tradition: Armagh Pipers Club

Venue: Belfast Waterfront

2017
 Folk Singer of the Year: Kris Drever
 Best Duo: Ross Ainslie & Ali Hutton
 Best Group: The Furrow Collective
 Best Album: Songs of Separation - Songs of Separation
 Horizon Award: Daoirí Farrell
 Musician of the Year: Rachel Newton
 Young Folk Award: Josie Duncan & Pablo Lafuente
 Best Original Song: If Wishes Were Horses - Kris Drever
 Best Traditional Track: Van Diemen’s Land - Daoirí Farrell
 Lifetime Achievement Awards: Al Stewart and Ry Cooder
 Hall of Fame: Woody Guthrie

Venue: Royal Albert Hall, London

2016

 Folk Singer of the Year: Rhiannon Giddens
 Best Duo: Kathryn Roberts and Sean Lakeman
 Best Group: The Young'uns
 Best Album: Mount the Air - The Unthanks
 Horizon Award: Sam Kelly
 Musician of the Year: Andy Cutting
 Young Folk Award: Brìghde Chaimbeul

 Best Original Song: Mackerel - The Rheingans Sisters

 Best Traditional Track: Lovely Molly - Sam Lee
 Lifetime Achievement Awards: Joan Armatrading and Norma Waterson
 Good Tradition Award:  John McCusker
 Hall of Fame: Sandy Denny

Venue: Royal Albert Hall, London

2015

 Folk Singer of the Year: Nancy Kerr
 Best Duo: Josienne Clarke & Ben Walker
 Best Group: The Young'uns
 Best Album: Tincian - 9Bach
 Horizon Award: The Rails
 Musician of the Year: Sam Sweeney
 Young Folk Award: Talisk
 Best Original Song: Swim to the Star - Peggy Seeger/Calum MacColl
 Best Traditional Track: Samhradh Samhradh - The Gloaming
 Lifetime Achievement Awards: Yusuf Islam/Cat Stevens and Loudon Wainwright III
 Good Tradition Award:  Meredydd Evans
 Hall of Fame: Ewan MacColl

Venue: Millennium Centre, Cardiff

2014
 Folk Singer of the Year: Bella Hardy
 Best Duo: Phillip Henry & Hannah Martin
 Best Group: The Full English
 Best Album: The Full English - The Full English
 Horizon Award: Greg Russell and Ciaran Algar
 Musician of the Year: Aidan O'Rourke
 Young Folk Award: The Mischa Macpherson Trio
 Best Original Song: Two Ravens - Lisa Knapp
 Best Traditional Track: Willie of Winsbury - Anaïs Mitchell and Jefferson Hamer
 Lifetime Achievement Awards: Clannad and Martin Carthy
 Good Tradition Award:  Cambridge Folk Festival
 Hall of Fame: Cecil Sharp

Venue: Royal Albert Hall, London

2013
 Folk singer of the year: Nic Jones
 Best Duo: Kathryn Roberts and Sean Lakeman
 Best Group: Lau
 Best Album: Broadside - Bellowhead
 Horizon Award: Blair Dunlop
 Musician of the year: Kathryn Tickell
 Young Folk Award: Greg Russell and Ciaran Algar
 Best Original Song: Hatchlings - Emily Portman
 Best Traditional Track: Lord Douglas - Jim Moray
 Lifetime achievement awards: Aly Bain and Roy Harper
 Lifetime achievement award for contribution to songwriting: Dougie MacLean
 Roots Award: Billy Bragg

Venue: Glasgow Royal Concert Hall

2012
Folk Singer of the year: June Tabor
 Best Duo: Tim Edey & Brendan Power
 Best Traditional Track: Bonny Bunch of Roses - June Tabor & Oysterband
 Best Group: June Tabor & Oysterband
 Young Folk Award: Ioscaid
 Musician of the year: Tim Edey
 Best Original Song: The Herring Girl - Bella Hardy and The Reckoning – Steve Tilston
 Horizon Award: Lucy Ward
 Best Album: Ragged Kingdom – June Tabor & Oysterband
 Lifetime achievement awards: The Dubliners and Don McLean
 Best Live Act: The Home Service
 Good Tradition Award: Ian Campbell and Bill Leader
 Roots Award: Malcolm Taylor

Venue: The Lowry, Salford

2011
 Folk Singer of the year: Chris Wood
 Best Duo: Nancy Kerr & James Fagan
 Best Traditional Track: Poor Wayfaring Stranger - Eliza Carthy & Norma Waterson
 Best Group: Bellowhead
 Young Folk Award: Moore Moss Rutter
 Musician of the year: Andy Cutting
 Best Original Song: Hollow Point - Chris Wood
 Horizon Award: Ewan McLennan
 Best Album: Gift – Eliza Carthy & Norma Waterson
 Lifetime achievement award: Donovan
 Best Live Act: Bellowhead
 Good Tradition Award: Fisherman's Friends
 Roots Award: Levellers

Venue: The Brewery, London

2010
 Folk Singer of the Year: Jon Boden
 Best Duo: Show of Hands
 Best Group: Lau
 Best Album: Hill of Thieves by Cara Dillon 
 Best Original Song:  Arrogance Ignorance and Greed by Steve Knightley (performed by Show of Hands) 
 Best Traditional Track: Sir Patrick Spens by Martin Simpson
 Horizon Award: Sam Carter
 Musician of the Year: John Kirkpatrick
 Best Live Act: Bellowhead
 Lifetime Achievement Award: Nanci Griffith 
 Lifetime Achievement Award: Dick Gaughan
 Folk Club Award: The Magpies Nest
 Good Tradition Award: Transatlantic Sessions

2009
 Folk Singer of the Year: Chris Wood
 Best Duo: Chris While and Julie Matthews
 Best Group: Lau
 Best Album: Trespasser by Chris Wood
 Best Original Song: All You Pretty Girls by Andy Partridge (performed by Jim Moray)
 Best Traditional Track: The Lark in the Morning by Jackie Oates
 Horizon Award: Jackie Oates
 Musician of the Year: Tom McConville
 Best Live Act: The Demon Barbers
 Lifetime Achievement Award: James Taylor
 Lifetime Achievement Award: Judy Collins
 Folk Club Award: Black Swan Folk Club, York

2008
 Folk Singer of the Year: Julie Fowlis
 Best Duo: John Tams and Barry Coope
 Best Group: Lau
 Best Album: Prodigal Son by Martin Simpson
 Best Original Song: Never Any Good by Martin Simpson
 Best Traditional Track: Cold Haily Rainy Night by The Imagined Village
 Horizon Award: Rachel Unthank and the Winterset
 Musician of the Year: Andy Cutting
 Best Live Act: Bellowhead
 Lifetime Achievement Award: John Martyn
 Good Tradition Award: Shirley Collins
 Folk Club Award: Dartford Folk Club

2007
 Folk Singer of the Year: Seth Lakeman
 Best Duo: Martin Carthy and Dave Swarbrick
 Best Group: Bellowhead
 Best Album: Freedom Fields by Seth Lakeman
 Best Original Song: Daisy by Karine Polwart
 Best Traditional Track: Barleycorn (performed by Tim van Eyken)
 Musician of the Year: Chris Thile
 Horizon Award: Kris Drever
 Best Live Act: Bellowhead
 Lifetime Achievement Award: Pentangle
 Lifetime Achievement Award: Danny Thompson
 Good Tradition Award: Nic Jones
 Folk Club Award: The Ram Club
 Favourite Folk Track Award (public vote): Who Knows Where The Time Goes (performed by Sandy Denny / Fairport Convention)

2006
 Folk Singer of the Year: John Tams
 Best Duo: John Spiers and Jon Boden
 Best Group: Flook
 Best Album: The Reckoning by John Tams
 Best Original Song: One In A Million by Chris Wood and Hugh Lupton
 Best Traditional Track: Bitter Withy (performed by John Tams)
 Horizon Award: Julie Fowlis
 Musician of the Year: Michael McGoldrick
 Lifetime Achievement Award: Paul Brady
 Lifetime Achievement Award: Richard Thompson
 Best Live Act: Kate Rusby
 Good Tradition Award: Ashley Hutchings
 Folk Club Award: Red Lion, Birmingham
 Most Influential Folk Album of All Time (public vote): Liege and Lief by Fairport Convention

2005
 Folk Singer of the Year: Martin Carthy
 Best Duo: Aly Bain and Phil Cunningham
 Best Group: Oysterband The Big Session
 Best Album: Faultlines by Karine Polwart
 Best Original Song: The Sun's Comin' Over The Hill by Karine Polwart
 Best Traditional Track: Famous Flower Of Serving Men (performed by Martin Carthy)
 Horizon Award: Karine Polwart
 Musician of the Year: Kathryn Tickell
 Lifetime Achievement Award: Ramblin' Jack Elliott
 Lifetime Achievement Award (Songwriting): Tom Paxton
 Best Live Act: Bellowhead
 Best Dance Band: Whapweasel
 Good Tradition Award: Steeleye Span
 Folk Club Award: Hitchin Folk Club

2004
 Folk Singer of the Year: June Tabor
 Best Duo: John Spiers and Jon Boden
 Best Group: Danú
 Best Album: Sweet England by Jim Moray
 Best Original Song: Co. Down by Tommy Sands (performed by Danú)
 Best Traditional Track: Hughie Graeme (performed by June Tabor)
 Horizon Award: Jim Moray
 Musician of the Year: Martin Simpson
 Lifetime Achievement Award: Dave Swarbrick
 Lifetime Achievement Award (Songwriting): Steve Earle
 Best Live Act: Show of Hands
 Good Tradition Award: Celtic Connections
 Folk Club Award: Rockingham Arms, Wentworth

2003
 Folk Singer of the Year: Eliza Carthy
 Best Duo: Nancy Kerr and James Fagan
 Best Group: Altan
 Best Album: Anglicana by Eliza Carthy
 Best Original Song: No Telling performed by Linda Thompson
 Best Traditional Track: Worcester City performed by Eliza Carthy
 Horizon Award: John Spiers and Jon Boden
 Instrumentalist of the Year: John McCusker
 Lifetime Achievement Award: Christy Moore
 Lifetime Achievement Award (Songwriting): John Prine
 Best Live Act: Roy Bailey and Tony Benn
 Good Tradition Award: Oysterband
 Folk Club Award: Edinburgh

2002
 Folk Singer of the Year: Martin Carthy
 Best Album: The Bramble Briar by Martin Simpson
 Best Original Song: Lullabye by Kate Rusby
 Best Traditional Track: Black Is the Color performed by Cara Dillon
 Best Group: Cherish the Ladies
 Horizon Award: Cara Dillon
 Instrumentalist of the Year: Martin Simpson
 Lifetime Achievement Award: The Chieftains
 Lifetime Achievement Award (Songwriting): Ralph McTell
 Lifetime Achievement Award: Fairport Convention
 Folk Club Award: Nettlebed
 Best Live Act: Rory McLeod

2001
 Folk Singer of the Year: Norma Waterson
 Best Album: Unity by John Tams
 Best Original Song: Harry Stone (Hearts of Coal) by John Tams
 Best Group: Danú
 Horizon Award: Bill Jones
 Instrumentalist of the Year: Michael McGoldrick
 Lifetime Achievement Award: Bert Jansch
 Radio 2 Special Roots Award: Taj Mahal 
 Good Tradition Award: Bob Copper
 Folk Club Award: The Davy Lamp
 Best Live Act: Vin Garbutt

2000
 Folk Singer of the Year: Kate Rusby
 Best Album: Sleepless by Kate Rusby
 Best Original Song: A Place Called England by Maggie Holland
 Best Traditional Track: Raggle Taggle Gypsy performed by Waterson–Carthy
 Best Group: Waterson–Carthy
 Horizon Award: Nancy Kerr and James Fagan
 Instrumentalist of the Year: Martin Hayes
 Radio 2 Special Award: Joan Baez
 Radio 2 Special Roots Award: Youssou N'Dour
 Andy Kershaw Roots Award: Joe Boyd and Lucy Durán
 Good Tradition Award: Topic Records
 Folk Club Award: Westhoughton
 Best Live Act: La Bottine Souriante

See also
 Scots Trad Music Awards

References

External links

The BBC's 2019 Folk Awards Site
The BBC's 2018 Folk Awards Site
The BBC's 2017 Folk Awards Site
The BBC's 2016 Folk Awards Site
The BBC's 2015 Folk Awards site
The BBC's 2014 Folk Awards site
The BBC's 2013 Folk Awards site
The BBC's 2012 Folk Awards site
The BBC's 2011 Folk Awards site
The BBC's 2010 Folk Awards site

BBC Radio 2 programmes
BBC Radio 2 Folk Awards
Awards established in 2000
Lifetime achievement awards
2000 establishments in the United Kingdom
Folk music awards